Wong Cho-lam (born Wong Ho-yin; 9 January 1980) is a Hong Kong entertainer currently working as the Chief Creative Officer of TVB. He works as a stage actor, stage director, television actor, voice actor, DJ, television host, lyricist, scriptwriter and singer. He is also the host of Hunan TV's World's Got Talent.

Background
He graduated from The Hong Kong Academy For Performing Arts in 2003 with First Honors in Bachelor of Arts majoring in acting. He is a member of the Composers and Authors Society of Hong Kong.

His most noted work includes his performance in the long-running popular TVB series, Best Selling Secrets (同事三分親) portraying the character, Lau Wah (樓華). In 2008, he signed on as an artist with EEG (英皇娛樂), and became one of the presenters of Super Trio Supreme (鐵甲無敵獎門人).

He was a co-host during the 2008 and 2010 Miss Hong Kong Pageant with Eric Tsang. He won Most Improved Actor at the 2008 TVB Awards.

Cho-lam's debut album Cho-lam Everywhere was released on 27 November 2008. Out of 10 songs in the album, Cho-lam wrote the lyrics for eight of them, with each song covering different areas in life, including family, friends, love, work, etc. which all aimed to share positive messages with the audience.

Cho-lam was one of the cast members of Keep Running, the Chinese version of the Korean game show Running Man, broadcast on Zhejiang TV in 2014. He also left EEG Plus in 2014, officially shifting his focus away from being a singer.

In Jan 2021, Cho-lam was appointed as the Chief Creative Officer of TVB.

Personal life
Wong was a primary school classmate with singer Joey Yung, and in 2012, Wong discovered he is a distant cousin of Eason Chan in his visit to his ancestral home in Dongguan, China. On 19 November 2014, Cho-lam publicly proposed to Leanne Li during live TVB Anniversary show, and was witnessed by TVB officials and colleagues. They married on Valentine's Day in 2015. The couple are devoted Protestants, who have both publicly declared sexual abstinence before marriage. They had a daughter, Gabrielle Wong, who was born on 17 December 2018. Wong is one of the Hong Kong celebrities that voice support for the National People's Congress decision on Hong Kong national security legislation.  In December 2020, Cho-lam welcomed the birth of his second daughter Hayley.

Filmography

Television

Film

Variety

Discography
 Cho-lam Everywhere (2008)
"Love For Real"(2010)
 All About Loving You (2011)
"Love For Real 2"(2011)
Fook Lu Shau   Brother (2012)
"Love For Real 3"(2012)
"Curious Case"(2013)
"Love For Real 4"(2013)

Awards and nominations

References

External links
 Official TVB Blog of Wong Cho-lam
 Wong Cho-lam on Sina Twitter
 Wong Cho-lam on Sina Weibo
 
 

|-
! colspan="3" style="background: #DAA520;" | TVB Anniversary Awards
|-

1980 births
Living people
Alumni of The Hong Kong Academy for Performing Arts
Hong Kong male film actors
Hong Kong male television actors
Hong Kong male comedians
Hong Kong male voice actors
Hong Kong male stage actors
Hong Kong television presenters
Hong Kong radio presenters
Hong Kong male singers
TVB actors
21st-century Hong Kong male actors
20th-century Hong Kong male actors
Hong Kong Christians
Hong Kong Protestants
Hong Kong screenwriters